Zanjani Sahib shrine is a famous Sufi shrine situated in the Chah Miran area of Lahore city, Pakistan.  An early Sufi saint,  Syed Miran Hussain Zanjani (died 1042 CE) is buried here. He is a  Hussaini Syed and arrived from his native Zanjan in Iran to preach Islam in Lahore.

References

Cultural heritage sites in Punjab, Pakistan
Sufi shrines in Pakistan
Shrines in Lahore